The oyster toadfish, Opsanus tau, also known as the oyster toad, ugly toad, oyster cracker, oyster catcher, and bar dog, is a Northeast Atlantic species of fish of the family Batrachoididae. The world record size for this species is 19.2 inches which is 48.76 cm. They are generally yellowish with a pattern of brown oblique bars.

The species can live in poor conditions and needs little food to live. It is an omnivore. Common prey include crustaceans, mollusks, amphipods, squid, and other smaller fish. Oyster toadfish rely upon camouflage to catch their food; they lie motionless waiting for prey to pass close by, then attack by surprise. They can be found near the shore from Maine to Florida.

The fish has a distinctive "foghorn" sound used by males to attract females in the mating season, which is April–October. The sound-producing (sonic) muscles attached to its swimbladders are the fastest known vertebrate muscles. Following the foghorn sound, the female comes into the nest, lays eggs, and then leaves (the toadfish lays the largest eggs of any Chesapeake Bay fish). The male fertilizes the eggs; they hatch after about one month. When the eggs hatch, the young toadfish stay attached to the yolk for some time.  When the yolk has been absorbed for energy, the young toadfish learn to swim. Even when the young have started to swim, the adult still protects its young.

Toadfish have a venomous spine on their first dorsal fin.  Pain from this venom has been compared to a bee or wasp sting.  

In 1998, NASA sent the oyster toadfish into space to investigate the effects of microgravity on the development of otolithic organs. The study found little difference between terrestrial development and those in space.

References

External links
  Hear the foghorn-like sound of the oyster toadfish, from 
  the NASA experiment
  more NASA

Opsanus
Fauna of the Eastern United States
Fish of the Atlantic Ocean
Fish described in 1766
Taxa named by Carl Linnaeus